Hartsfield is an unincorporated community in Colquitt County, Georgia, United States. Hartsfield has a post office with ZIP code 31756, which opened on April 21, 1875.

The community was named after John L. Hartsfield, the proprietor of a local sawmill.

References

Unincorporated communities in Colquitt County, Georgia
Unincorporated communities in Georgia (U.S. state)